Jasbir Singh Gill (Dimpa) is an Indian politician and a Member of Parliament to the 17th Lok Sabha from Khadoor Sahib (Lok Sabha constituency) of Punjab,India. He won the Indian general election 2019 as an Indian National Congress candidate. In the year 2002 he was elected to the Punjab Legislative Assembly from Beas constituency . In December 2020, he was in an issue with young female reporter questioning him about the farmers' protest live on TV.

Early life and education
Jasbir Singh Gill was born on 8 November 1968 in Amritsar, Punjab. He is son of Satwiinder Kaur Gill and late Sant Singh Liddar. His father was a member of Punjab legislative assembly (1985-1986) from Beas constituency and died fighting terrorists on 26 April 1986, Gill was 18 years old when he narrowly escaped from this attack. He completed his primary schooling from Saint Francis School Amritsar and later joined Shivalik public school, Chandigarh. In 1987, militants injured him while he was going to his native village. In 1988, He graduated from Guru Nanak Dev University, Amritsar. In a later attack in 1989 at his native village Liddar, terrorists killed all seven guards at his house but he narrowly escaped and survived. All these attacks happened during the Punjab insurgency period.

Early political career
He was first elected as Sarpanch of Lidhar village of Punjab in 1982. In late 1992 after the relative peace in Punjab, he was re-elected as village Sarpanch of Lidhar. He later went on to serve as the president of Punjab youth congress from 1997 to 1999 and as General Secretary of Indian youth congress from 1999 to 2005.

Legislative assembly
Jasbir sing Gill won his first assembly election from Beas (renamed as Baba Bakala in 2012) in 2002. He defeated Manjinder Singh Kang from Shiromani Akali Dal (SAD) by a margin of 6450 votes and became a member of the Punjab legislative assembly. During his tenure, he also became the chairmen Punjab water supply and sewerage board for the period 2003-2007. He also served as chairmen of Public accounts, Estimates, and Petition Committee of Punjab Vidhan sabha. In the next assembly election, he lost his seat to Manjinder Singh Kang by a narrow margin of 4179 votes. In 2012 he contested from Amritsar south but lost to Inderbir Singh Bolaria of Shiromani Akali Dal with a Margin 15056 votes.

Member of parliament
He filed his nomination from the khadoor sahib constituency for a four-way battle between Shiromani Akali Dal (Taksali), Shiromani Akali Dal, Punjab Ekta Party, and the Indian National Congress. Gill defeated his closest rival Bibi Jagir Kaur of the Shiromani Akali Dal (SAD) by a margin of 140573 votes. He has emerged as a vocal leader in the Parliament and has recently asked (alongside Vincent H Pala) a Starred Question to the Home Affairs about the existence of controversial "Tukde Tukde Gang". The Minister of State for Home G Kishan Reddy said "the ministry has no information on any such group". In his first year as MP, he has received approval for a Government Medical College in Kapurthala and a Law University in Patti.

Performance in parliament 
Performance in the Lok Sabha, 2019-20

Parliamentary committees 
He is a member of the Standing Committee on Personnel, Public Grievances and Law and Justice and Member of Consultative Committee, Ministry of Petroleum and Natural Gas.

Election results

Awards
Silver medal in the Duke of Edinburgh's Award for increasing health awareness.

References

External links
Official biographical sketch in Parliament of India website

India MPs 2019–present
Lok Sabha members from Punjab, India
Living people
Indian National Congress politicians
People from Kapurthala district
1968 births